Senator Lockwood may refer to:

Charles C. Lockwood (1877–1958), New York State Senate
Emil Lockwood (1919–2002), Michigan Senate State Senate